Bethel Township, Ohio, may refer to:

Bethel Township, Clark County, Ohio
Bethel Township, Miami County, Ohio
Bethel Township, Monroe County, Ohio

Ohio township disambiguation pages